Pratylenchus vulnus (also known by the common names Walnut meadow nematode and Walnut root-lesion nematode) is a species of plant pathogenic nematode best known for infecting Persian walnut. It is also known to infest potatoes, apricots, peaches and nectarines, holiday cacti, grape and citruses.

References

External links 
 Nemaplex, University of California - Pratylenchus vulnus 

vulnus
Plant pathogenic nematodes
Grape pest nematodes